Egervár is a village on the Sárvíz (Zala) stream in Zala County, Hungary.

Sights
Castle of Egervár

References

External links 

Populated places in Zala County